Invisible Jan, is a 1943 Soviet drama film directed by Isidor Annensky and Vladimir Petrov.

Plot 
The film tells about the confrontation between Czechoslovak patriots and German fascists.

Starring 
 Evgeniy Samoylov as Jani (as E. Samoylov)
 Evgeniya Gorkusha as Milcha (as Evgenia Gorkusha-Shirshova)
 Yuri Aleqsi-Meskhishvili as Jaroslavi
 Giorgi Davitashvili as Professor
 K. Dobjinski as Drabeki

References

External links 
 

1943 films
1940s Russian-language films
Soviet drama films
Soviet black-and-white films
1943 drama films